Stewart Sutin is a higher education leader. He currently serves in the advisory board of the STAR Scholars Network. He served as an associated director of the Institute for International Studies in Education (IISE) at the University of Pittsburgh. He is also a past president of the Community College of Allegheny County in Pennsylvania.

Sutin earned his doctorate in Latin American history from the University of Texas at Austin in 1975. He was previously employed by Mellon Financial Corporation.

Under Sutin, the college was criticized for cutting class offerings while raising the salaries of administrators by double digit percentages. In 2004, Sutin received a $20,000 bonus while the college was in a self-described financial crisis. Sutin was criticized by Allegheny County chief executive Dan Onorato for taking expensive trips and buying a CCAC-paid membership in the Duquesne Club.

External links
 Dr. Sutin faces strong questions from CCAC employees, Post Gazette

References 

Year of birth missing (living people)
Living people
People from Allegheny County, Pennsylvania
University of Texas at Austin College of Liberal Arts alumni
Place of birth missing (living people)